Lajos Werkner (23 October 1883 – 12 November 1943) was a Hungarian Olympic champion sabre fencer.

Early and personal life
Werkner was born in Budapest, Hungary, and was Jewish. Werkner was educated as a mechanical engineer.

Fencing career
Wernker trained at the Nemzeti Vívó Club (NVC) in Budapest.

Werkner won team gold medals at the 1908 Olympics in London at 24 years of age, and at the 1912 Olympics in Stockholm at 28 years of age, placing sixth-seventh individually. He won the Hungarian Championship in sabre in 1912–14.

After retiring from competitions in 1914, Werkner remained active as a sports official.

Werkner died at age 60 in Budapest.

Hall of Fame
In 1999 Werkner was inducted into the International Jewish Sports Hall of Fame.

See also
List of select Jewish fencers

References

External links 

 Olympic record
 Jewish Sports bio
 
 Jews in Sports bio

1883 births
1943 deaths
Jewish male sabre fencers
Hungarian male sabre fencers
Olympic fencers of Hungary
Olympic gold medalists for Hungary
Fencers at the 1908 Summer Olympics
Fencers at the 1912 Summer Olympics
Jewish Hungarian sportspeople
Martial artists from Budapest
Olympic medalists in fencing
International Jewish Sports Hall of Fame inductees
Medalists at the 1908 Summer Olympics
Medalists at the 1912 Summer Olympics
Road incident deaths in Hungary